Uboldo (  or Ambold ) is a comune (municipality) in the Province of Varese in the Italian region Lombardy, located about 20 km northwest of Milan and about 25 km southeast of Varese.

References

External links
 Official website

Cities and towns in Lombardy